Alexander Ramsey Nininger Jr.  (October 20, 1918 – January 12, 1942) was a Second Lieutenant of the Philippine Scouts who received the Medal of Honor during World War II.

Biography
Nininger, nicknamed "Sandy", was born in Gainesville, Georgia in 1918. He attended the United States Military Academy and graduated in May 1941. After being commissioned a Lieutenant he was sent to the Philippines and was attached to the 57th Infantry Regiment (United States) of the Philippine Scouts. After entering active service, according to Malcolm Gladwell, Nininger "wrote a friend to say that he had no feelings of hate, and did not think he could ever kill anyone out of hatred. He had none of the swagger of the natural warrior. He worked hard and had a strong sense of duty."  Nininger loved to draw pictures.

During the first month of the Japanese invasion of the Philippines, Nininger's unit helped prepare American defenses in Bataan. After the Japanese launched their assault on Bataan, Niinger voluntarily joined another company because his unit was not yet engaged in combat.

Nininger was killed in action near Abucay, Bataan on January 12, 1942. He was posthumously awarded the Medal of Honor for leading an assault on Japanese positions. He was the first American army soldier to be so honored in the Second World War.

West Point
Nininger graduated from the US Military Academy at West Point with the Class of 1941. At the Academy, he was involved in track, the debating society, and was chairman of the lecture committee. He was part of the Academy's 3rd Battalion "L" Company, in which he served as a Cadet Sergeant.

"Sandy" Nininger's Yearbook biography is as follows: "'--'tis not what man does which exalts him, but what man would do!' It was Sandy's good fortune to be provided with the means and the background necessary to know and appreciate the many arts. His interest in the theatre, a devotion to books and music, and a love for painting make him an excellent conversationalist. Could it be these artistic inclinations that have so often prompted 'Is she pro?' Proof enough isn't it, that Sandy was one of us?"

The West Point Class of 1941 Yearbook also lists Nininger's hometown as Ft. Lauderdale, FL.

Medal of Honor citation
Rank and organization: Second Lieutenant, 57th Infantry, Philippine Scouts, U.S. Army. Place and date: Near Abucay, Bataan, Philippine Islands, January 12, 1942. Entered service at: Fort Lauderdale, Fla. Born: Gainesville, Georgia.

Citation:
For conspicuous gallantry and intrepidity above and beyond the call of duty in action with the enemy near Abucay, Bataan, Philippine Islands, on 12 January 1942. This officer, though assigned to another company not then engaged in combat, voluntarily attached himself to Company K, same regiment, while that unit was being attacked by enemy force superior in firepower. Enemy snipers in trees and foxholes had stopped a counterattack to regain part of position. In hand-to-hand fighting which followed, 2d Lt. Nininger repeatedly forced his way to and into the hostile position. Though exposed to heavy enemy fire, he continued to attack with rifle and hand grenades and succeeded in destroying several enemy groups in foxholes and enemy snipers. Although wounded 3 times, he continued his attacks until he was killed after pushing alone far within the enemy position. When his body was found after recapture of the position, 1 enemy officer and 2 enemy soldiers lay dead around him.

Further honors and legacy
The First Division of Cadet Barracks at West Point is named in his honor.  Nininger was the first United States soldier to receive the Medal of Honor in World War II. In 2006 an award was created in his honor by the Association of Graduates of the US Military Academy: The Alexander R. Nininger Award for Valor at Arms. It is given to West Point graduates who have displayed courage in combat and upheld the values of West Point. The first awardee was Major Ryan L. Worthan.

Two transport ships were named in honor of Nininger:   was launched as Alexander R. Nininger, Jr., (but ultimately renamed for another Medal of Honor recipient).  The second was a Victory ship that was named USAT Lt. Alexander R. Nininger. His home town of Ft. Lauderdale, Florida also erected a statue in his honor.  Alexander “Sandy” Nininger State Veterans’ Nursing Home is in Pembroke Pines, Florida, near Ft. Lauderdale.  A rifle range at the Infantry School, Fort Benning, Georgia "Nininger Range" is named in remembrance of Alexander Nininger.

See also

List of Medal of Honor recipients
List of Medal of Honor recipients for World War II
Battle of Bataan
Philippine Scouts
USAT Lt. Alexander R. Nininger

References

External links
 

United States Army Medal of Honor recipients
United States Army personnel killed in World War II
United States Military Academy alumni
United States Army officers
1918 births
1942 deaths
Nininger, Alexander R.
People from Fort Lauderdale, Florida
People from Gainesville, Georgia
American expatriates in the Philippines
World War II recipients of the Medal of Honor